The Forester's Daughter is a 1962 West German historical musical film directed by Franz Josef Gottlieb and starring Sabine Sinjen, Peter Weck and Gerlinde Locker. It was one of four film versions of the 1907 operetta Die Försterchristl.

It was made at the Bavaria Studios in Munich.

Cast
 Sabine Sinjen as Christel, gen. Försterchristel
 Peter Weck as Kaiser Franz Joseph
 Georg Thomalla as Simmerl, Flickschneider
 Gerlinde Locker as Ilona
 Sieghardt Rupp as Franz Földessy aka Rittmeister Franz Koltai
 Doris Kirchner as Gräfin Elisabeth Paalen
 Rudolf Vogel as Oberhofmeister
 Wolf Albach-Retty as Graf Paalen
 Oskar Sima as Leisinger, Geheimpolizist
 Ernst Waldbrunn as Wirt
 Raoul Retzer as Hütl
 Edith Schultze-Westrum
 Horst Naumann as Hauptmann Toni Felsinger
 Hans Habietinek

References

Bibliography 
 Thomas Elsaesser & Michael Wedel. The BFI companion to German cinema. British Film Institute, 1999.

External links 
 

1962 films
1960s historical musical films
German historical musical films
West German films
1960s German-language films
Films directed by Franz Josef Gottlieb
Films set in Austria
Operetta films
Films based on operettas
Films set in the 1850s
Films about royalty
1960s German films